was a village located in Kitasaitama District, Saitama Prefecture, Japan.

On January 1, 2006, Minamikawara was merged into the expanded city of Gyōda.

Dissolved municipalities of Saitama Prefecture
Gyōda